This is a list of the operettas and operas of the Austrian composer Carl Millöcker (1842–1899).

Millöcker wrote 20 light operas, of which 16 are described as operettas, one as a Singspiel, one as a 'Volksoper' ('people's opera'). (The other two were left undesignated.) His music is closely associated with the Theater an der Wien in Vienna, where 14 of his works received their first performances.

List

References
Lamb, Andrew (1992), "Millöcker, Carl" in The New Grove Dictionary of Opera, ed. Stanley Sadie (London) 

 
Lists of operas by composer
Lists of compositions by composer